ASDF may refer to:

 Advanced Scientific Data Format, a form of storing astronomical data
 Air Self-Defense Force, in Japan
 Alabama State Defense Force, a military entity
 Alaska State Defense Force, a military entity
 Another System Definition Facility, a build system for Common Lisp
 ASDF, the sequence of letters from the left end of the home row on some keyboard layouts